The 1994 Railway Cup Hurling Championship was the 66th staging of the Railway Cup since its establishment by the Gaelic Athletic Association in 1927. The cup began on 6 February 1994 and ended on 21 February 1994.

Leinster were the defending champions.

On 21 February 1994, Connacht won the cup after a 1–11 to 1–10 defeat of Leinster in the final at Semple Stadium. This was their 9th Railway Cup title overall and their first title since 1991.

Results

Semi-finals

Final

Bibliography

 Donegan, Des, The Complete Handbook of Gaelic Games (DBA Publications Limited, 2005).

References

Railway Cup Hurling Championship
Railway Cup Hurling Championship
Hurling